Rosalie Anderson MacDowell (born April 21, 1958) is an American actress and former fashion model. MacDowell's known for her starring film roles in romantic comedies and dramas.  MacDowell has modeled for Calvin Klein and has been a spokeswoman for L'Oréal since 1986.

Her early films include Greystoke: The Legend of Tarzan, Lord of the Apes (1984) and the Brat Pack vehicle film St. Elmo's Fire (1985). Her breakout role was in Sex, Lies, and Videotape (1989) which earned her the Independent Spirit Award for Best Female Lead and a nomination for a Golden Globe Award for Best Actress – Motion Picture Drama. She then starred in a series of films including  Green Card (1990), Groundhog Day (1993), Short Cuts (1993), Four Weddings and a Funeral (1994), Michael (1996), Multiplicity (1996), and The Muse (1999). 

She is also known for her supporting film roles in Beauty Shop (2005), Footloose (2011), Magic Mike XXL (2015), Love After Love (2017), and Ready or Not (2019). She co-starred opposite her daughter Margaret Qualley in the Netflix miniseries Maid (2021) for which she was nominated for a Golden Globe Award for Best Supporting Actress – Series, Miniseries or Television Film.

Early life
MacDowell was born on April 21, 1958, in Gaffney, South Carolina, to Pauline "Paula" Johnston (née Oswald), a music teacher, and Marion St. Pierre MacDowell, a lumber executive. She has three older sisters and her ancestry includes English, French, Scottish, Irish, and Welsh. Her mother was an alcoholic, and her parents divorced when she was six. MacDowell's mother died of a heart attack in 1981 at age 53 after living sober for a year. When MacDowell was eight, her father remarried, this time to the former Mary Frances Stone; this union lasted until his death. MacDowell graduated from Gaffney High School in 1976, then went on to attend Winthrop University for two years before moving briefly to Columbia, South Carolina. After having been spotted by a representative from Wilhelmina Models while she was on a trip to Los Angeles, MacDowell signed a modeling contract with Elite Model Management in New York City in 1978.

Career

In the early 1980s, MacDowell modeled for Vogue magazine and appeared in ad campaigns for Yves Saint Laurent, Vassarette, Armani perfume, Sabeth-Row, Mink International, Anne Klein, and Bill Blass. A series of billboards in Times Square and national television commercials for Calvin Klein won attention and led to her 1984 film debut in Greystoke: The Legend of Tarzan, Lord of the Apes. In this role, MacDowell's lines were dubbed by Glenn Close because her Southern accent was considered too pronounced for her role as Jane. In 1985, MacDowell filled a supporting role as a doctor in St. Elmo's Fire.

MacDowell studied method acting with teachers from the Actors Studio in addition to working privately with the renowned coaches Harold Guskin and Warren Robertson. Four years later, director Steven Soderbergh cast her in the independent film Sex, Lies, and Videotape (1989). Her performance earned her an Independent Spirit Award, a Los Angeles Film Critics Association Award, and a nomination for the Golden Globe Award for Best Actress, among others award nominations, which led to a series of starring roles in films such as Green Card, The Object of Beauty, and Short Cuts. In the 1990s, MacDowell achieved stardom due to the box office success of director Harold Ramis's 1993 comedy, Groundhog Day, as well as that of Four Weddings and a Funeral (1994), opposite Hugh Grant.

Since 1986, MacDowell has appeared in print and television advertisements for  cosmetic and haircare company L'Oréal. In 2000 she starred in Harrison's Flowers. In later years, she has acted primarily on television and in independent films. In 2012, she co-starred in the short-lived ABC Family series Jane by Design. From 2013 to 2015, she starred in the Hallmark Channel family series Cedar Cove. In 2018 MacDowell starred in and produced the Hallmark Hall of Fame film directed by Roger Spottiswoode based on the novel by Mary Alice Monroe, The Beach House. Also in 2018, she was cast in the horror comedy film Ready or Not, which was shot over 26 days. The film was released in 2019, and was a critical and commercial success. In 2019, she starred in the BBC sitcom Cuckoo. In an episode of NBC's Mr. Mayor that aired January 2021, MacDowell plays a fictionalized version of herself. In the same year MacDowell stars alongside her daughter, Margaret Qualley, in the Netflix show Maid.

Personal life 
In 1986, MacDowell married Paul Qualley, a rancher and fellow former model. The two met while posing for Gap ads. They had a son, Justin, and two daughters, Rainey, named Miss Golden Globe 2012, and Margaret, an actress.

MacDowell and Qualley divorced in 1999. Following her divorce from Qualley, MacDowell entered a year-long relationship with actor Dennis Quaid. In 1999, through her sister Julia, MacDowell reconnected with her former high school classmate, Rhett Hartzog, a businessman whom she married on November 10, 2001. The couple subsequently divorced in October 2004. As of 2013, she has resided in Marina del Rey, California.

Awards

References

External links

 

1958 births
Living people
Actresses from South Carolina
Female models from South Carolina
American film actresses
American people of English descent
American people of French descent
American people of Irish descent
American people of Scottish descent
American people of Welsh descent
American television actresses
César Honorary Award recipients
Independent Spirit Award for Best Female Lead winners
Independent Spirit Award winners
People from Gaffney, South Carolina
Winthrop University alumni
20th-century American actresses
21st-century American actresses
L'Oréal people
People from Arden, North Carolina
Volpi Cup winners